Hannachi (also spelled Hanachi) is a Maghrebi Arabic surname common in Tunisia and Algeria. Originally designating the members of a semi-independent tribe, the Hanencha, whose territory was located in Eastern Algeria and Western Tunisia. Notable people with the surname include:

 Maher Hannachi (born 1984), Tunisian footballer 
 Mohand Chérif Hannachi (1950–2020), Algerian footballer
 Raouf Hannachi, Canadian muezzin 

Arabic-language surnames
Surnames of Algerian origin